Gate is an extinct town in Scott County, in the U.S. state of Arkansas.

History
A post office called Gate was established in 1888, and remained in operation until 1921. The community was named for the toll gate which operated at the town site.

References

Geography of Scott County, Arkansas
Ghost towns in Arkansas